Geoffrey Dernis (born 24 December 1980) is a French footballer who plays as a midfielder for RCO Agde in the Championnat National 3.

Honours
Lille
 Ligue 2: 1999–2000
 UEFA Intertoto Cup: 2004

Montpellier
 Ligue 1: 2011–12

References

External links
 
 France U-17 season 1996–97
 

Living people
1980 births
People from Grande-Synthe
Sportspeople from Nord (French department)
Association football midfielders
French footballers
French expatriate footballers
Lille OSC players
Wasquehal Football players
RCO Agde players
AS Saint-Étienne players
Montpellier HSC players
Stade Brestois 29 players
Ligue 1 players
Ligue 2 players
Championnat National 3 players
French expatriate sportspeople in Greece
Expatriate footballers in Greece
Footballers from Hauts-de-France